The President's Awards are two annual awards given out by the American Hockey League (AHL). The first award is presented to an AHL organization and recognizes "excellence in all areas off the ice." The second is given to a player as recognition of outstanding accomplishments in that year. The awards were first handed out following the 2008–09 season.

The first recipients were the Manitoba Moose and Alexandre Giroux. Since its inception no winning players have been a part of the winning organization.

Winners

References 

American Hockey League trophies and awards